Nicholas Hencher (born 24 August 1961) is a Welsh former professional footballer who played as a winger. He made appearances in the English Football League with Wrexham under non-contract terms. He also played for Lex XI in the Welsh league.

References

1961 births
Living people
Footballers from Wrexham
Welsh footballers
Association football wingers
Lex XI F.C. players
Wrexham A.F.C. players
English Football League players